is a video game developed and published by Konami for PlayStation 2 in 2000–2001. A sequel, ESPN Winter X-Games Snowboarding 2002, was released in 2001.

Reception

The game received "average" reviews according to the review aggregation website Metacritic.

See also 

 ESPN X Games Skateboarding
 ESPN International Winter Sports 2002
 List of snowboarding video games

References

External links
 

2000 video games
ESPN video games
Konami games
PlayStation 2 games
PlayStation 2-only games
Snowboarding video games
Video games developed in Japan